Sam Barlow is a British video game designer, best known as the writer and designer of Her Story, the two British Silent Hill games, Silent Hill: Origins and Silent Hill: Shattered Memories, and Immortality. He previously worked as a game director at Climax Studios, before leaving in 2014 to become an indie game developer. He published his first independent game, Her Story, in June 2015. In 2017 he founded Half Mermaid, a video game production company based in Brooklyn, New York.

Interactive fiction
Barlow was active in the interactive fiction scene of the late 1990s, most notably releasing the game Aisle in 1999. It won the XYZZY Award for Best Use of Medium. Like his later Silent Hill games, Aisle features a psychologically damaged viewpoint character, a contemporary setting and a positive meaning at its heart.

In March 2016, during the Game Developers Conference, Barlow announced he had joined the interactive media firm Interlude, later rebranded as Eko, to help them develop an interactive media reboot of the 1983 film WarGames. The work #WarGames launched in early 2018.

Influences
Barlow frequently cites novelists and film directors as having influenced his work. He claims that Hitchcock, Luis Buñuel and J. G. Ballard influenced his work on Silent Hill: Shattered Memories. Both Silent Hill titles reference Shakespeare (Silent Hill: Origins features a performance of The Tempest, whilst Silent Hill: Shattered Memories has multiple references to Twelfth Night). He has also been inspired by David Lynch, Mark Z. Danielewski, Paul Auster, Shirley Jackson, The Exorcist and Gene Wolfe. Consistently his most frequently cited influence is Hitchcock, for example: "I bored everyone with Hitchcock and talking about his techniques and his ideas of suspense" and "Hitchcock said that all horror goes back to childhood, that's why it's a universal thing – it's a fundamental". Barlow cites Cronenberg's The Fly and Paul Schrader's Cat People as showing how best to reboot an existing story.

Video games

Canceled games

References

External links
 Her Story Her Story official website
 Climax Studios Climax Studios' official website

Living people
Silent Hill
Video game designers
Place of birth missing (living people)
Year of birth missing (living people)
British video game designers
Video game writers
Interactive fiction writers